SCMM may refer to:

 Sequenom Center for Molecular Medicine, a division of Sequenom, a manufacturer of DNA massarrays.
 Southern California Medical Museum, in Riverside, California, United States.